Pico dos Três Estados ("Three States Peak") is a mountain peak at which the three Brazilian states of Minas Gerais, Rio de Janeiro, and São Paulo all meet, respectively in the municipalities of Passa Quatro, Resende and Queluz.

At the exact point where the three borders meet, there is an iron tripod with the names of each state.

References

Landforms of Minas Gerais
Landforms of São Paulo (state)
Landforms of Rio de Janeiro (state)
Mountains of Brazil